NCID may refer to:

 Network Caller ID, an open-source client/server network Caller ID package
 NCID (book identifier), an identifier for books, used by CiNii, a bibliographic database maintained by the Japanese National Institute of Informatics
 National Centre for Infectious Diseases, a quarantine and management centre for contagious diseases in Singapore